Demonstone is a 1990 Australian action thriller film directed by Andrew Prowse. The film stars R. Lee Ermey, Jan-Michael Vincent and Nancy Everhard. The film tells the story of two US Marines in Manila investigating a series of crimes.

Cast
 R. Lee Ermey as Col. Joe Haines
 Jan-Michael Vincent as Andy Buck
 Nancy Everhard as Sharon Gale
 Peter Brown as Admiral
 Pat Skipper as Tony McKee
 Joonee Gamboa as Sen. Belfardo / Chief Pirate
 Joe Mari Avellana as Han Chin
 Rolando Tinio as Prof. Olmeda
 Marilyn Bautista as Julie
 Frederick Bailey as Navy Doctor
 Pen Medina as General
 Cris Vertido as Sung Tzu
 Noel Colet as Esteban Belfardo
 Rina Reyes as Madeleine
 Rey Malte-Cruz as Roberto
 Louie Katana as Wu
 Monsour del Rosario as Pablo
 Symon Soler as R.J. Belfardo
 Ryan Abastillas as Street Kid
 Jonic Magno as Teenage Shop Worker
 Charles Nnebe as MP #1
 David Anderson as Gunnery Sergeant
 Eric Hahn as Pilot

Production
It was shot under the working title Heartstone.

References

External links 

1990 films
1990 thriller films
Australian action thriller films
Films shot in Manila
Films shot in the Philippines
1990s English-language films
1980s English-language films
Films directed by Andrew Prowse